Smoke damage may refer to:

 Damage caused by exposure to smoke
 "Smoke Damage", an episode of the TV series Medium